Jabal Saraj (Persian/) is a town in the Jabal Saraj District of Parwan Province, Afghanistan. The Jabal Saraj Palace, which was originally built by Amir Habibullah Khan in 1907, is located in this town. It is the main attraction for visitors.

Climate

Jabal Saraj town has a Mediterranean climate (Köppen climate classification Csa) with hot, dry summers and cold, wet winters. Snow is not unusual in winter. Nearby areas may have a cold semi-arid climate (Köppen climate classification BSk) or a humid continental climate (Köppen climate classification Dsa/Dsb) depending on altitude and topography.

References

Populated places in Parwan Province